Part One is the second album by the American psychedelic rock group The West Coast Pop Art Experimental Band, and was released in February 1967 on Reprise Records. It features compositions by Bob Johnston, Frank Zappa, Baker Knight, P.F. Sloan and Van Dyke Parks with input from studio drummer Hal Blaine. It has a song most well known as "Morning Dew" composed by Bonnie Dobson with arrangement by Danny Harris. This is the first album with input from guitarist Ron Morgan.

The song "I Won't Hurt You" was later featured in the 2018 stop motion animated film, Isle of Dogs.

Track listing 

Track list information from CD liner notes of the 2001 re-master of Part One, from Sundazed Music, Inc.

Personnel
Bob Markley – spoken word, backing vocals
Michael Lloyd – vocals, electric guitar
Danny Harris – vocals, electric guitar
Ron Morgan – electric guitar
Shaun Harris – vocals, bass guitar
John Ware – drums

References

1967 albums
The West Coast Pop Art Experimental Band albums
Reprise Records albums